The Music From "The Connection" is an album of music composed by jazz pianist Freddie Redd for Jack Gelber's 1959 play The Connection. This first recording of the music was released on the Blue Note label in 1960. It features performances by Redd, Jackie McLean, Michael Mattos, and Larry Ritchie. 

Jack Gelber originally planned for the play to feature improvised music performed by jazz musicians who would also play small roles in the production. Freddie Redd however persuaded Gelber to include his original score. Redd recorded his score again later in 1960 as Music from the Connection.

Track listing 
All compositions by Freddie Redd
 "Who Killed Cock Robin" - 5:21
 "Wigglin'" - 5:58
 "Music Forever" - 5:52
 "Time To Smile" - 6:24
 "(Theme for) Sister Salvation" - 4:43
 "Jim Dunn's Dilemma" - 5:37
 "O.D. (Overdose)" - 4:41

Personnel 
 Freddie Redd - piano
 Jackie McLean - alto saxophone
 Michael Mattos - bass
 Larry Ritchie - drums

References 

1960 albums
Freddie Redd albums
Jackie McLean albums
Theatre soundtracks
Hard bop albums
Albums recorded at Van Gelder Studio